Talk shows are highlighted in  yellow, local programming is white, reruns of prime-time programming are orange, game shows are pink, soap operas are chartreuse, news programs are gold and all others are light blue. New series are highlighted in bold.

NOTE: This page is missing info on the DuMont Network, which started daytime transmission before any other United States television network.

Monday-Friday

There is some dispute as to the exact lineup on DuMont in the winter. The above listing is according to What Women Watched: Daytime Television in the 1950s (University of Texas Press, 2005) by Marsha Cassidy. This would create a conflict with some other sources that have TV Shopper still in the lineup at this time.

 On Dumont, Okay, Mother was previously aired on New York based WABD channel, then the network flagship station.

By network

ABC
Returning Series
Cartoon Teletales
The Singing Lady

CBS

Returning Series
The U.N. in Action

New Series
The Adventures of Lucky Pup
The Chuck Wagon
Classifield Column
Here's Archer
Ladies Day
The Ted Steele Show

Not Returning From 1947-48
The Missus Goes a-Shopping

NBC

Returning Series
Howdy Doody

New Series
These Are My ChildrenVanity FairWestern BalladeerNot Returning From 1947-48Playtime
The Swift Home Service Club

DumontNew SeriesJohnny Olson's Rumpus RoomOkay, MotherTV Shopper'''

See also
1948-49 United States network television schedule (prime-time)

Notes

Sources
https://web.archive.org/web/20071015122215/http://curtalliaume.com/abc_day.html
https://web.archive.org/web/20071015122235/http://curtalliaume.com/cbs_day.html
https://web.archive.org/web/20071012211242/http://curtalliaume.com/nbc_day.html
https://web.archive.org/web/20070803174527/http://soapoperahistory.com/daytime/series/womantoremember/index.htm

United States weekday network television schedules
1948 in American television
1949 in American television